Owrma (also Romanized as Owrmā) is a village in Khoshabar Rural District, in the Central District of Rezvanshahr County, Gilan Province, Iran. At the 2006 census, its population was 882, in 216 families.

References 

Populated places in Rezvanshahr County